Over the course of its history, the province of Manitoba has witnessed numerous of its populated communities experience decline to become ghost towns. Triggers were usually changes in economic conditions, such as natural resource prices or resource depletion, or changes in transportation networks, such as rail alignment selection, rail line closures and highway realignments.

List

See also 

List of census divisions of Manitoba
List of communities in Manitoba
List of ghost towns in Canada
List of municipalities in Manitoba
York Factory – former trading post

Manitoba
Ghost towns